Dunchadh Ua Cellaig, 39th King of Uí Maine and 4th Chief of the Name, died 1074.

The Annals of the Four Masters note his death as follows:

Donnchadh Ua Ceallaigh, lord of Ui-Maine, was killed by his brother, Tadhg, grandson of Conchobhar Ua Ceallaigh, on the island of Loch-Caelain.  

This would appear to make him a grandson of Concobar mac Tadg Ua Cellaigh, who ruled the kingdom from 1014 to 1030.

References

 The Tribes and customs of Hy-Many, commonly called O'Kelly's country, John O'Donovan, 1843.
 Annals of Ulster at CELT: Corpus of Electronic Texts at University College Cork
 Annals of Tigernach at CELT: Corpus of Electronic Texts at University College Cork
Revised edition of McCarthy's synchronisms at Trinity College Dublin.

People from County Galway
People from County Roscommon
Dunchadh
11th-century Irish monarchs
Kings of Uí Maine